Bad Teinach-Zavelstein is a town in the district of Calw, in Baden-Württemberg, Germany.

History
The township of Bad Teinach-Zavelstein was formed on 1 January 1975 by the merging of Bad Teinach, Zavelstein, and the towns of Emberg, Rötenbach, Schmieh, and Sommenhardt.

Geography
The township (Stadt) of Bad Teinach-Zavelstein is located at the center of the district of Calw, in Baden-Württemberg, one of the 16 States of the Federal Republic of Germany. Bad Teinach-Zavelstein's municipal area rests upon the plateau of the Enz and Nagold rivers, a landscape defined by severe river erosion, in the greater Black Forest region. Elevation above sea level in the municipal area ranges from a high of  Normalnull (NN) to a low of  NN.

A portion of the Federally protected  nature reserve is located in Bad Teinach-Zavelstein's municipal area.

Politics
Bad Teinach-Zavelstein has six boroughs, Bad Teinach, Emberg, Rötenbach, Schmieh, Sommenhardt, and Zavelstein, and five villages, Kentheim, Kollwanger Sägmühle, Lützenhardt, Teinachtal, Wilhelmshöhe.

Coat of arms
Bad Teinach-Zavelstein's municipal coat of arms is divided party per fess into an upper field of yellow with three black , and a lower field of five yellow and red squares in a checkerboard pattern. The checkboard pattern is an archaic reference to the name Zavelstein using the word zabel, and the stag antlers are taken from the Coat of arms of Württemberg. This coat of arms was awarded by the Calw district office to Bad Teinach-Zavelstein with an accompanying municipal flag on 13 February 1981.

Transportation

References

External links

  (in German)

Calw (district)
Württemberg
Spa towns in Germany